The 2008–09 Tennessee Volunteers basketball team represented the University of Tennessee in the 2008-09 NCAA Division I men's basketball season. This was the fourth season for Bruce Pearl as the Volunteers' head coach. The team, a member of the Eastern Division of the Southeastern Conference, played its home games at Thompson-Boling Arena.

Preseason
The 2007–08 Volunteers finished the season 31–5 overall with a 14–2 mark in conference play. They won their first outright SEC regular season men's basketball championship in 41 years. In postseason play, the Volunteers earned a No. 2 seed in the NCAA tournament. The team went on to lose in the Sweet Sixteen to the Louisville Cardinals and finished ranked at #7 in the ESPN/USA Today poll.

The Vols lost three seniors from their team during the off-season: Chris Lofton, JaJuan Smith, and Jordan Howell. Also, sophomore forward Duke Crews and sophomore point guard Ramar Smith were dismissed from the team for a combination of "violations of the University of Tennessee’s substance-abuse policy and academic shortcomings."

On November 3, 2008, the SEC released the rosters for the preseason All-SEC first and second teams. Junior forward Tyler Smith was chosen for both SEC Player of the Year and first team All-SEC. Wayne Chism and J. P. Prince were selected for the second team All-SEC, thus tying Tennessee with LSU for the most All-SEC selections (3).

Recruiting
Bruce Pearl was able to pull together a highly ranked recruiting class for the 2008–09 season. The class included: Emmanuel Negedu, rated 13th among power forwards in the Class of 2008 by Rivals.com; Renaldo Woolridge, the 11th ranked small forward; Bobby Maze, a junior college guard averaging 20.7 points, 4.5 rebounds and 6.8 assists per game; and Scotty Hopson, a McDonald's All-American and ranked 5th overall by Rivals.com. The class also includes point guard Daniel West and center Philip Jurick. Rivals.com ranked the class as 7th best in the nation.

2008–09 Roster

Schedule and Results

|-
!colspan=12 style=|Regular season

|-
!colspan=12 style=|SEC Tournament 

 |-
!colspan=12 style=|NCAA Tournament

Rankings

References

Tennessee
Tennessee
Tennessee Volunteers basketball seasons
Tennessee Volunteers basketball
Tennessee Volunteers basketball